A National Character Area (NCA) is a natural subdivision of England based on a combination of landscape, biodiversity, geodiversity and economic activity. There are 159 National Character Areas and they follow natural, rather than administrative, boundaries. They are defined by Natural England, the UK government's advisors on the natural environment.

NCA profiles 

As part of its responsibilities in delivering the Natural Environment White Paper, Biodiversity 2020 and the European Landscape Convention, Natural England is revising its National Character Area profiles to make environmental evidence and information easily available to a wider audience. Revised profiles for all 159 NCAs were published in September 2014. The new NCAs are being published in a rolling program and can be found on the Natural England website.

NCAs are areas that share similar landscape characteristics, and which follow natural lines in the landscape rather than administrative boundaries, making them a good decision-making framework for the natural environment. National Character Area profiles are guidance documents which can help communities to inform their decision-making about the places that they live in and care for. The information they contain will support the planning of conservation initiatives at a landscape scale, inform the delivery of nature improvement areas and encourage broader partnership working through local nature partnerships. The profiles will also help to inform choices about how land is managed and can change.

Each profile includes a description of the natural and cultural features that shape our landscapes, how the landscape has changed over time, the current key drivers for ongoing change, and a broad analysis of each area's characteristics and ecosystem services. Statements of environmental opportunity (SEOs) are suggested, which draw on this integrated information. The SEOs offer guidance on the critical issues, which could help to achieve sustainable growth and a more secure environmental future.

NCA profiles are working documents which draw on current evidence and knowledge. Natural England aim to refresh and update them periodically as new information becomes available.

NCAs by region 
Natural England list the Natural Character Areas by regions. Because some overlap regional boundaries, they may be shown in more than one region.

North East 
1. North Northumberland Coastal Plain
2. Northumberland Sandstone Hills
3. Cheviot Fringe
4. Cheviots
5. Border Moors & Forests
10. North Pennines
11. Tyne Gap & Hadrian's Wall
12. Mid Northumberland
13. South East Northumberland Coastal Plain
14. Tyne & Wear Lowlands
15. Durham Magnesian Limestone Plateau
16. Durham Coalfield Pennine Fringe
22. Pennine Dales Fringe
23. Tees Lowlands
25. North York Moors and Cleveland Hills

North West 
5. Border Moors & Forests
6. Solway Basin
7. West Cumbria Coastal Plain
8. Cumbria High Fells
9. Eden Valley
10. North Pennines
11. Tyne Gap & Hadrian's Wall
17. Orton Fells
18. Howgill Fells
19. South Cumbria Low Fells
20. Morecambe Bay Limestones
21. Yorkshire Dales
31. Morecambe Coast & Lune Estuary
32. Lancashire & Amounderness Plain
33. Bowland Fringe & Pendle Hill
34. Bowland Fells
35. Lancashire Valleys
36. Southern Pennines
51. Dark Peak
53. South West Peak
54. Manchester Pennine Fringe
55. Manchester Conurbation
56. Lancashire Coal Measures
57. Sefton Coast
58. Merseyside Conurbation
59. Wirral
60. Mersey Valley
61. Shropshire, Cheshire & Staffordshire Plain
62. Cheshire Sandstone Ridge

Yorkshire and the Humber 
10. North Pennines
21. Yorkshire Dales
22. Pennine Dales Fringe
23. Tees Lowlands
24. Vale of Mowbray
25. North Yorkshire Moors & Cleveland Hills
26. Vale of Pickering
27. Yorkshire Wolds
28. Vale of York
29. Howardian Hills
30. Southern Magnesian Limestone
33. Bowland Fringe & Pendle Hill
34. Bowland Fells
35. Lancashire Valleys
36. Southern Pennines
37. Yorkshire Southern Pennine Fringe
38. Nottinghamshire, Derbyshire & Yorkshire Coalfield
39. Humberhead Levels
40. Holderness
41. Humber Estuary
42. Lincolnshire Coast & Marshes
43. Lincolnshire Wolds
44. Central Lincolnshire Vale
45. Northern Lincolnshire Edge with Coversands
50. Derbyshire Peak Fringe & Lower Derwent
51. Dark Peak

East Midlands 
30. Southern Magnesian Limestone
37. Yorkshire Southern Pennine Fringe
38. Nottinghamshire, Derbyshire & Yorkshire Coalfield
39. Humberhead Levels
42. Lincolnshire Coast & Marshes
43. Lincolnshire Wolds
44. Central Lincolnshire Vale
45. Northern Lincolnshire Edge with Coversands
46. The Fens
47. South Lincolnshire Edge
48. Trent & Belvoir Vales
49. Sherwood
50. Derbyshire Peak Fringe & Lower Derwent
51. Dark Peak
52. White Peak
53. South West Peak
54. Manchester Pennine Fringe
64. Potteries & Churnet Valley
68. Needwood & South Derbyshire Claylands
69. Trent Valley Washlands
70. Melbourne Parklands
71. Leicestershire & South Derbyshire Coalfield
72. Mease/Sence Lowlands
73. Charnwood
74. Leicestershire & Nottinghamshire Wolds
75. Kesteven Uplands
88. Bedfordshire & Cambridgeshire Claylands
89. Northamptonshire Vales
91. Yardley-Whittlewood Ridge
92. Rockingham Forest
93. High Leicestershire
94. Leicestershire Vales
95. Northamptonshire Uplands
96. Dunsmore & Feldon
107. Cotswolds

West Midlands 
52. White Peak
53. South West Peak
61. Shropshire & Staffordshire Plain
63. Oswestry Uplands
64. Potteries & Churnet Valley
65. Shropshire Hills
66. Mid Severn Sandstone Plateau
67. Cannock Chase & Cank Wood
68. Needwood & South Derbyshire Claylands
69. Trent Valley Washlands
70. Melbourne Parklands
72. Mease/Sence Lowlands
94. Leicestershire Vales
95. Northamptonshire Uplands
96. Dunsmore & Feldon
97. Arden
98. Clun & North West Herefordshire Hills
99. Black Mountains & Golden Valley
100. Herefordshire Lowlands
101. Herefordshire Plateau
102. Teme Valley
103. Malvern Hills
104. South Herefordshire & Over Severn
105. Forest of Dean & Lower Wye
106. Severn & Avon Vales
107. Cotswolds

East of England 
46. The Fens
76. North West Norfolk
77. North Norfolk Coast
78. Central North Norfolk
79. North East Norfolk & Flegg
80. The Broads
81. Greater Thames Estuary
82. Suffolk Coast & Heaths
83. South Norfolk & High Suffolk Claylands
84. Mid Norfolk
85. The Brecks
86. South Suffolk & North Essex Clayland
87. East Anglian Chalk
88. Bedfordshire Claylands
89. Northamptonshire Vales
90. Bedfordshire Greensand Ridge
91. Yardley-Whittlewood Ridge
92. Rockingham Forest
110. Chilterns
111. Northern Thames Basin
115. Thames Valley

South East and London 
81. Greater Thames Estuary
88. Bedfordshire Claylands
90. Bedfordshire Greensand Ridge
91. Yardley-Whittlewood Ridge
95. Northamptonshire Uplands
107. Cotswolds
108. Upper Thames Clay Vales
109. Midvale Ridge
110. Chilterns
111. Northern Thames Basin
112. Inner London
113. North Kent Plain
114. Thames Basin Lowlands
115. Thames Valley
116. Berkshire and Marlborough Downs
119. North Downs
120. Wealden Greensand
121. Low Weald
122. High Weald
123. Romney Marshes
124. Pevensey Levels
125. South Downs
126. South Coast Plain
127. Isle of Wight
128. South Hampshire Lowlands
129. Thames Basin Heaths
130. Hampshire Downs
131. New Forest
132. Salisbury Plain & West Wiltshire Downs
134. Dorset Downs and Cranborne Chase
135. Dorset Heaths

South West 
100. Herefordshire Lowlands
103. Malvern Hills
104. South Herefordshire and Over Severn
105. Forest of Dean and Lower Wye
106. Severn and Avon Vales
107. Cotswolds
108. Upper Thames Clay Vales
109. Midvale Ridge
116. Berkshire and Marlborough Downs
117. Avon Vales
118. Bristol, Avon Valleys and Ridges
129. Thames Basin Heaths
130. Hampshire Downs
131. New Forest
132. Salisbury Plain and West Wiltshire Downs
133. Blackmoor Vale and Vale of Wardour
134. Dorset Downs and Cranborne Chase
135. Dorset Heaths
136. South Purbeck
137. Isle of Portland
138. Weymouth Lowlands
139. Marshwood and Powerstock Vales
140. Yeovil Scarplands
141. Mendip Hills
142. Somerset Levels and Moors
143. Mid Somerset Hills
144. Quantock Hills
145. Exmoor
146. Vale of Taunton and Quantock Fringes
147. Blackdowns
148. Devon Redlands
149. The Culm
150. Dartmoor
151. South Devon
152. Cornish Killas
153. Bodmin Moor
154. Hensbarrow
155. Carnmenellis
156. West Penwith
157. The Lizard
158. Isles of Scilly
159. Lundy

References 

Geography of England
Environment of England